The Diocese of Nemosia (Latin: Dioecesis Nimociensis seu Limosiensis) or Diocese of Limasol was a Roman Catholic diocese in Cyprus, located in the city of Limassol. It was suppressed in the 16th century after the Ottoman conquest of Cyprus.

Ordinaries
Michael Padrolo, O.P. (17 Nov 1443 – ?)
...
Marco Cornaro (4 Apr 1514 – 22 Mar 1516 Resigned)
Paulus Borgasius (22 Mar 1516 – 1539 Resigned)
Andreas Centanus (Zantinus) (14 Jul 1539 Appointed – )
Andrea Mocenigo (bishop) (19 Jun 1562 – 1569 Died)
Serafino Fortibraccia, O.P. (24 Jan 1569 – 1571 Died in Siege of Famagusta)

Titular bishops
Stephapnus Lusignanus, O.P. (27 Apr 1588 – )

See also
Catholic Church in Cyprus

References

Catholic Church in Cyprus
Limassol
16th-century disestablishments
Former Roman Catholic dioceses